Leonardo da Silva Vieira (born 22 September 1990), commonly known as Léo, is a Brazilian professional footballer who plays as a goalkeeper for Inter de Limeira.

Honours
Athletico Paranaense
Campeonato Paranaense: 2019
J.League Cup / Copa Sudamericana Championship: 2019
Copa do Brasil: 2019

References

External links
 

1990 births
People from Suzano
Footballers from São Paulo (state)
Living people
Brazilian footballers
Brazil youth international footballers
Association football goalkeepers
São Paulo FC players
Clube Atlético Linense players
Paraná Clube players
Club Athletico Paranaense players
Atlético Clube Goianiense players
Rio Ave F.C. players
Associação Atlética Internacional (Limeira) players
Campeonato Brasileiro Série A players
Campeonato Brasileiro Série B players
Brazilian expatriate footballers
Expatriate footballers in Portugal
Brazilian expatriate sportspeople in Portugal